Stor-Elvdal is a municipality in Innlandet county, Norway. It is located in the traditional district of Østerdalen. The administrative centre of the municipality is the village of Koppang. Other villages in the municipality include Atna, Evenstad, and Sollia.

The  municipality is the 28th largest by area out of the 356 municipalities in Norway. Stor-Elvdal is the 262nd most populous municipality in Norway with a population of 2,318.

General information
The parish of Store Elvedalen was established as a municipality on 1 January 1838 (see formannskapsdistrikt law). During the 1960s, there were many municipal mergers across Norway due to the work of the Schei Committee. On 1 January 1965, the neighboring municipality of Sollia (population: 356) was merged with Stor-Elvdal (population: 3,808) to form a new, larger municipality of Stor-Elvdal.

Name
The municipality is named Stor-Elvdalen after the old name of the historic prestegjeld with the same name. The name  is the historic name for the area. The first element this part of the name is the genitive case of the word  which means "river" (here it is referring to the Glomma river) and the last element is dalr which means "valley" or "dale". Thus this word means "river valley". This prefix was added to the old name "Elvdalen" to distinguish it from the municipality of Lille Elvedalen (later the name was shortened to Alvdal). In the late Middle Ages the two areas were distinguished using the words Ytre Elvdalen (meaning "outer" Elvdalen) and Øvre Elvdalen (meaning "upper" Elvdalen).

Coat of arms
The coat of arms were granted in 1988. The arms show two white or silver-colored two-man saws on a green background. This design was chosen to symbolize the importance of forestry in the municipality.

Churches
The Church of Norway has four parishes within the municipality of Stor-Elvdal. It is part of the Sør-Østerdal prosti (deanery) in the Diocese of Hamar.

Government
All municipalities in Norway, including Stor-Elvdal, are responsible for primary education (through 10th grade), outpatient health services, senior citizen services, unemployment and other social services, zoning, economic development, and municipal roads. The municipality is governed by a municipal council of elected representatives, which in turn elects a mayor.  The municipality falls under the Østre Innlandet District Court and the Eidsivating Court of Appeal.

Municipal council
The municipal council  of Stor-Elvdal is made up of 17 representatives that are elected to four year terms. The party breakdown of the council is as follows:

Mayors
The mayors of Stor-Elvdal (incomplete list):
1995-1999: Sigmund Vestad (LL)
1999-2003: Øyvind Strand (Ap)
2003-2011: Sigmund Vestad (LL)
2011-2015: Even Moen (Sp)
2015-2019: Terje Hoffstad (Ap)
2019–present: Even Moen (Sp)

Geography
Stor-Elvdal is bordered on the north by the municipalities of Folldal and Alvdal, on the east by Rendalen, in the south by Åmot and Ringsaker, in the west by Øyer and Ringebu, and in the northwest by Sør-Fron.

The lake Atnsjøen is located in the northwestern part of the municipality, just outside Rondane National Park. The river Glomma runs through the municipality.

Tourism
Stor-Elvdal boasts the second tallest moose statue in the world, a steel giant moose at the side of the Norwegian National Road 3.

Notable people 
 Thore Embretsen Myrvang (1858–1939) an educator and politician, three times Mayor of Stor-Elvdal
 Halldis Neegaard Østbye (1896 in Stor-Elvdal – 1983) In WWII known as "Norway's most fanatical Naziwoman"
 Torkel Andreas Trønnes (1925-2011) an automobile advocate, lived in Koppang

Sister cities
Stor-Elvdal has sister city agreements with the following places:
  Sõmeru Parish, Lääne-Viru County, Estonia

References

External links

Municipal fact sheet from Statistics Norway 

 
Municipalities of Innlandet
1838 establishments in Norway